Eucalyptus crispata, commonly known as the Yandanooka mallee, is a species of tall mallee that is endemic to a small area on the east coast of Western Australia. It has a stocking of rough bark near the base of its trunk, smooth grey bark above, lance-shaped adult leaves, flower buds in groups of between nine and eleven, whitish to yellowish cream flowers and cup-shaped, barrel-shaped or hemispherical to cylindrical fruit.

Description
Flowering occurs between March and June and the flowers are whitish to yellowish cream.

Taxonomy and naming
Eucalyptus crispata was first formally described by the botanists Ian Brooker and Stephen Hopper in 1991. The description was published in the journal Nuytsia from a type specimen they collected near Yandanooka in 1986. It belongs to Eucalyptus subgenus Symphyomyrtus section Bisectae subsection Glandulosae because it has bisected cotyledons and buds with a scarred operculum. The specific epithet (crispata) is derived from the latin word crispus meaning "curly", in reference to the curled bark.

Distribution
Yandanooka mallee is found in clumps among lateritic breakaways and hills in the western Wheatbelt region of Western Australia between Dandaragan, Carnamah and Three Springs where it grows in gravelly sandy-loam soils. It is found in small stands among low mallee woodlands. Associated species include Eucalyptus arachnaea subsp. arachnaea, E. accedens, E. wandoo, Santalum acuminatum, Allocasuarina campestris and various species of Melaleuca.

Conservation status
This eucalypt is classified as "vulnerable" under the Australian Government Environment Protection and Biodiversity Conservation Act 1999 and as "Threatened Flora (Declared Rare Flora — Extant)" by the Department of Environment and Conservation (Western Australia). The main threats to the species include inappropriate fire regimes, dieback, grazing by livestock and land clearing.

See also
List of Eucalyptus species

References

Eucalypts of Western Australia
crispata
Myrtales of Australia
Plants described in 1991
Taxa named by Ian Brooker
Taxa named by Stephen Hopper